Birchip West is a locality in the Mount Jeffcot ward of the local government area of the Shire of Buloke, Victoria, Australia.

References